Chalow-ye Gavmishi (also Romanized as Chalow-ye Gāvmīshī and Chalow Gāvmīshī; also known as Chelow) is a village in Tiab Rural District, in the Central District of Minab County, Hormozgan Province, Iran. At the 2006 census, its population was 234, in 51 families.

References 

Populated places in Minab County